Ulrich Fugger von der Lilie (1441–1510) was a German businessman of the Fugger family. He formally headed the family firm from his father's death in 1469 until his own death in 1510 after an operation to remove a bladder stone, though his business skills never matched those of his younger brother Jakob Fugger.

Family
Fugger was born and died in Augsburg.  The eldest son of Jakob Fugger the Elder and his wife Barbara Bäsinger, he was a brother and business partner to his brothers Jakob Fugger and Georg Fugger. His other brothers included Georg Andreas (not to be confused with Andreas Fugger vom Reh), Johann (known as Hans, not to be confused with Ulrich's great-nephew Hans Fugger) and Peter. 

In 1479 he married Veronika Lauginger, with whom he had:
Anna (born 1484)
Ursula (born 1485)
Ulrich II (born 1490)
Sybille (born 1493)
Hieronymus (born 1499)

Family tree

Bibliography 
  Bayerische Staatsbibliothek München: Die Fugger im Bild. Selbstdarstellung einer Familiendynastie in der Renaissance, Ausstellungskatalog, Quaternio Verlag, Luzern 2010 
  Johannes Burkhardt: Das Ehrenbuch der Fugger, Faksimile, Transkription und Kommentar, 2 Bände, Wißner Verlag, Augsburg 2004 
  Martin Kluger: Die Fugger. Die deutschen Medici in und um Augsburg, Context Verlag, Augsburg 2009

External links 
  Ulrich Fugger bei H Wember

1441 births
1510 deaths
Medieval German merchants
Ulrich the Elder
15th-century German businesspeople
16th-century German businesspeople